Haibowan (Hairibin Tohoi) District (Mongolian:   , Хайрвийн тохой тойрог, Qayirub-un Toqoi toɣoriɣ) is a district of the city of Wuhai, Inner Mongolia, People's Republic of China.

References

www.xzqh.org 

County-level divisions of Inner Mongolia

lt:Uhajus